The Longest Week is a 2014 American comedy-drama film written and directed by Peter Glanz. The film stars Jason Bateman, Olivia Wilde and Billy Crudup in the lead roles. It was produced by Uday Chopra, along with Neda Armian. It is the first project of Yash Raj Film's subsidiary Hollywood production house YRF Entertainment. The film received generally negative reviews from critics.

Synopsis 
Affluent and aimless, Conrad Valmont lives a life of leisure in his parents’ prestigious Manhattan hotel. In the span of one week, he finds himself evicted, disinherited, and in love.

Cast 
 Jason Bateman as Conrad Valmont
 Olivia Wilde as Beatrice Fairbanks
 Billy Crudup as Dylan Tate
 Jenny Slate as Jocelyn
 Tony Roberts as Barry the Therapist

Reception 

Review aggregator website Rotten Tomatoes reports that 10% of 20 critics have given the film a positive review, with an average rating of 3.8/10. According to Metacritic, which assigned the film a weighted average score of 34 out of 100 based on nine critics, the film received "generally unfavorable reviews".

Film critic Peter Sobczynski gave the film a negative review, stating "unless your hunger for watching dimly conceived comedy dramas focusing on obnoxious and over-privileged jerks Coming to Terms with Things was not sated with the recent Last Weekend, most viewers will spend most of the running time wishing that they had simply stayed home and watched that Saved by the Bell docudrama that you DVR'd but haven't quite summoned up the courage to watch as of yet".

References

External links 
 
 Official site

2014 comedy-drama films
2014 films
2014 comedy films
2010s English-language films